Theodora is a given name of Greek origin, meaning "God's gift".

Theodora may also refer to:

Historical figures known as Theodora

Byzantine empresses 
 Theodora (wife of Justinian I) ( 500 – 548), saint by the Orthodox Church
 Theodora of Khazaria, 7th-century empress, wife of Justinian II
 Theodora (wife of Theophilos), 9th-century empress, saint by the Orthodox Church
 Theodora (wife of Romanos I), 10th-century empress
 Theodora (daughter of Constantine VII), 10th-century empress, wife of John I Tzimiskes
 Theodora Porphyrogenita (c. 980–1056), empress regnant in 1042 and 1055–1056
 Theodora Palaiologina (c. 1240–1303), wife of Michael VIII Palaiologos

Trebizonian empresses 
Theodora Axuchina, empress consort of Alexios I of Trebizond
Theodora of Trebizond (before 1253 – after 1285), empress regnant from 1284 to 1285
Theodora Kantakouzene (c. 1240 – after 1290), empress consort of Alexios III of Trebizond
Theodora Kantakouzene (wife of Alexios IV of Trebizond), empress consort of Alexios IV of Trebizond

Others 
 Theodora of Emesa, 5th-century Neoplatonist
 Flavia Maximiana Theodora, daughter of the Roman emperor Maximian and second wife of emperor Constantius I
 Episcopa Theodora, mother of Pope Paschal I in the 9th century
 Theodora (senatrix), Roman senatrix and mother of Marozia; concubine to Pope Sergius III
 Theodora Komnene (disambiguation)
 Theodora Tocco, despoina consort of Constantine, Despot in Morea (later Constantine XI Palaiologos).
 Princess Theodora of Greece and Denmark (1906–1969), daughter of Prince Andrew of Greece and Denmark
 Princess Theodora of Greece and Denmark (born 1983), daughter of Constantine II of Greece
 Princess Theodora zy Sayn-Wittgenstein-Berleburg (born 1986), German aristocrat
 Theodora (Roman martyr), 2nd-century Christian martyr and saint
 Theodora and Didymus, early Christian martyrs
 Theodora of Alexandria, Eastern Orthodox saint
 Theodora of Arta, 13th-century Empress of Epirus
 Theodora of Sihla, Romanian Orthodox saint

Works of art
 Theodora (Handel) (HWV 68), an oratorio by George Frideric Handel, based on the story of Theodora and Didymus
Either of these Italian silent films set in the Byzantine Empire:
 Theodora (1914 film)
 Theodora (1921 film)
 Darling Theodora, stage musical adaptation based on Disney's Oz the Great and Powerful by Disney Theatrical Productions.

Other uses
 Theodora Children's Charity, British charity
 Theodora, a synonym of the legume genus Schotia

See also
 Teodora
 Theodore (disambiguation)
 Théodore Guérin (Saint Theodora)
 Thea (name)